The Limeux transmitting station (mast 1) and  (mast 2)  is a facility for FM radio and television and mobile phone transmissions located near Abbeville, Somme, France.
It is the tallest built structure in the Somme.

The building of a second Mast
As in most countries, TV Broadcast was a state monopoly in France. As a consequence, when the market opened to competitors, the historic operator TDF had the advantage of already having all the requested infrastructures. By Law, it was decided to permit access of the existing infrastructures to the competitors, paying a rent to the historic operator. The Operator Itas Tim found it more profitable to build its own mast and not paying the rent, thus a second mast was built at the end of 2015. Itas tim switched over its own muxes to the new mast on February, 2nd 2016. But in the end TDF bought the operator Itas Tim at the end 2016.

Analogue services (Mast 1)

Digital switchover planned date on Abbeville-Limeux TV mast : February 1, 2011.

Digital services
Frequencies from May, 14th 2019
Originally,  all the multiplexes were transmitted from Mast 1. Itas tim's multiplexes were transferred to the new mast in early 2016.
Extra compression made it possible to delete mux 5 and then to sell the frequencies over 700 Mhz to mobile phone operators.

References

   Télévision Numérique Terrestre
   http://skyscraperpage.com/cities/?buildingID=75277 Mast Structure
   http://www.mds975.co.uk/masts/limeux.html Mast photos
   Émetteur de Limeux (article from which the data come from)

Radio masts and towers in Europe
Buildings and structures in Somme (department)
Towers in France
Transmitter sites in France
1960s establishments in France
Towers completed in the 1960s
Towers completed in 2016
20th-century architecture in France
21st-century architecture in France